Los Gemelos Diablo, previously known as Los Gemelos Pantera, are a Mexican professional wrestling tag team consisting of twin brothers Gemelo Diablo I and Gemelo Diablo II (Spanish for "Devil Twin I" and "Devil Twin II"; born May 23, 1999), previously known by their ring names as Gemelo Pantera I and Gemelo Pantera II respectively. They current work for the Mexican professional wrestling promotion Consejo Mundial de Lucha Libre (CMLL), portraying rudo ("Bad guy") wrestling characters. Their real names are not a matter of public record, as is often the case with masked wrestlers in Mexico, where their private lives are kept a secret from the wrestling fans.

Professional wrestling career

Personal lives
The wrestlers known as "Gemelo Diablo I" (Spanish for "Devil Twin I") and Gemelos Diablo II ("Devil Twin II") were both born and raised in Matamoros, Tamaulipas, Mexico, the twin sons of Pantera Blanca Jr and grandsons of Pantera Blanca.

Championships and accomplishments
Consejo Mundial de Lucha Libre
CMLL World Trios Championship (1 time) - with El Sagrado

Footnotes

References

1999 births
Consejo Mundial de Lucha Libre teams and stables
Identical twins
Living people
People from Matamoros, Tamaulipas
Professional wrestlers from Tamaulipas
Mexican promotions teams and stables
Mexican male professional wrestlers
Mexican twins
Twin sportspeople
Unidentified wrestlers
Masked tag teams
21st-century professional wrestlers